Lyonia ferruginea, the rusty staggerbush, tree lyonia, dragon tree, is a plant of the genus Lyonia. It was first described by Thomas Walter, and was named by Thomas Nuttall. No subspecies are listed in the Catalog of Life.

References

ferruginea
Flora of the Southeastern United States